In some sports, a Most Improved Player award is given to players who have improved the most over the year.

 Greek Basket League Most Improved Player
 Israeli Basketball Premier League Most Improved Player
 NBA Most Improved Player Award
 NBA G League Most Improved Player Award
 PWI Most Improved Wrestler of the Year
 WNBA Most Improved Player Award

Other uses
 "Most Improved Player" (The Good Place), an episode of the American comedy television series The Good Place